The Shawnee Sun was a newspaper published in the Shawnee language in Kansas from 1835 to 1844. The paper was founded by Baptist missionary Jotham Meeker, who created his own script for Shawnee, an Algonquian language. It was a missionary newspaper and attempted to convert the Shawnee to Christianity. It was the first newspaper published entirely in a Native American language.

Background 
Jotham Meeker was a Baptist missionary from Cincinnati, Ohio, who moved to modern-day Kansas in 1833. He attempted to convert the Shawnee—recently removed to Kansas by the Indian Removal Act of 1830—to Christianity, and he developed a script for transcribing the Algonquian languages (specifically the Shawnee language) to more quickly convert them. While their motivations are not clear, many Shawnee aided Meeker in his transcription work.

Publication and contents 
It was the first newspaper written entirely in a Native American language—its predecessor, the Cherokee Phoenix, was written in both English and Cherokee—and it was the first published in the modern-day state of Kansas. Meeker relied on the writings of both the Shawnee and white settlers in the publication. It was a missionary text, and most Shawnee (around 80 percent) were not Christian.

In its first issue, Johnston Lykins wrote in the style of the Genesis creation narratives about the importance of Christianity and conversion. In one of its surviving issues is a Solomon-like narrative about living in accordance with God's wishes. For the Sun writers, the Great Spirit of Shawnee culture and God were similar, and in an attempt to relate the two, they used the Shawnee word  for God; they used  (bad snake place) for Hell.

Only two pages of the paper survive, and both have been translated by George Blanchard, an elder in the Absentee Shawnee Tribe of Oklahoma. Its dimensions were 6  inches across by 10  inches tall.

Demise and cultural legacy 
The paper was published irregularly—first monthly, and then sporadically—and it dissolved in 1844. According to his review of the Shawnee Sun history in 1933, McMurtrie concluded that it had a limited readership, and printed perhaps only "two hundred copies to an issue". A second Baptist publication for Native Americans, the Cherokee Messenger, appeared in 1844.

One of its issues is located at the University of Missouri–Kansas City's archives. Following Blanchard's 2008 translation of the extant issues, the Shawnee have been better able to understand the paper.

Notes and references

Notes

Citations

Bibliography

  
 
 
 
 

 
 

Baptist newspapers
Defunct newspapers published in Kansas
Native American newspapers
Publications disestablished in 1844
Publications established in 1835
Shawnee history